Interaction is action that occurs between two or more entities, generally used in philosophy and the sciences. It may refer to:

Science
 Interaction hypothesis, a theory of second language acquisition
 Interaction (statistics), when three or more variables influence each other
 Interactions of actors theory, created by cybernetician Gordon Pask
 Fundamental interaction or fundamental force, the core interactions in physics
 Human–computer interaction, interfaces for people using computers
 Social interaction between people

Biology
 Biological interaction
 Cell–cell interaction
 Drug interaction
 Gene–environment interaction
 Protein–protein interaction

Chemistry
 Aromatic interaction
 Cation-pi interaction
 Metallophilic interaction

Arts and media
 Interaction (album), 1963, by Art Farmer's Quartet
 ACM Interactions, a magazine published by the Association for Computing Machinery
 "Interactions" (The Spectacular Spider-Man), an episode of the animated television series
 63rd World Science Fiction Convention, titled Interaction

See also
 
 
 Interact (disambiguation)